Ushtagan (Ushtagan, ۋشتاگان), also known as Üshtaghan, is a town in Mangystau Region, southwest Kazakhstan.

References

Mangystau Region
Cities and towns in Kazakhstan